In the religion of theosophy and the philosophical school called anthroposophy, the Akashic records are a compendium of all universal events, thoughts, words, emotions and intent ever to have occurred in the past, present, or future in terms of all entities and life forms, not just human. They are believed by theosophists to be encoded in a non-physical plane of existence known as the mental plane. There are anecdotal accounts but no scientific evidence for the existence of the Akashic records.

Akasha is the Sanskrit word for "aether", "sky", or "atmosphere".

History

Theosophical Society

The Sanskrit term akasha was introduced to the language of theosophy through Helena Blavatsky (1831–1891), who characterized it as a sort of life force; she also referred to "indestructible tablets of the astral light" recording both the past and future of human thought and action, but she did not use the term "akashic". 
The notion of an akashic record was further disseminated by Alfred Percy Sinnett in his book Esoteric Buddhism (1883) when he cites Henry Steel Olcott's A Buddhist Catechism (1881). Olcott wrote that "Buddha taught two things are eternal, viz, 'Akasa' and 'Nirvana': everything has come out of Akasa in obedience to a law of motion inherent in it, and, passes away. No thing ever comes out of nothing."

By C. W. Leadbeater's Clairvoyance (1899) the association of the term with the idea was complete, and he identified the akashic records by name as something a clairvoyant could read. 
In his 1913 Man: Whence, How and Whither,  Leadbeater claims to record the history of Atlantis and other civilizations as well as the future society of Earth in the 28th century.

Alice A. Bailey wrote in her book Light of the Soul on The Yoga Sutras of Patanjali – Book 3 – Union achieved and its Results (1927):

Rudolf Steiner

The Austrian theosophist, and later founder of Anthroposophy, Rudolf Steiner used the Akashic records concept mainly in a series of articles in his journal Lucifer-Gnosis from 1904 to 1908, where he wrote about Atlantis and Lemuria, topics related to their purported history and civilization. Besides this, he used the term in the title of lectures on a Fifth Gospel held in 1913 and 1914, shortly after the foundation of the Anthroposophical Society and Steiner's exclusion from the Theosophical Society Adyar.

Other

Edgar Cayce claimed to be able to access the Akashic records.

See also 
 Book of Life
 Chokhmah
 Collective unconscious
 Egregore
 Ervin László
 Esoteric cosmology

References

Anthroposophy
Esoteric cosmology
Theosophy
Theosophical philosophical concepts